Proszynskia is a small genus of south Asian jumping spiders erected by N. Kanesharatnam and Benjamin in 2019 after a molecular phylogenetic study of south Asian spiders showed the relationship between two species previously belonging to Marpissa and Phintella. The thin abdomen has a yellow stripe between two black stripes.

The genus is named after Jerzy Prószyński, a major contributor to the knowledge of jumping spiders, and  it contains only two species: P. anusuae and P. diatreta. The single most likely cladogram shows that Phintelloides is sister to Phintella, with Proszynskia sister to both:

See also
 Viciria
 Phintella
 Marpissa
 List of Salticidae genera

References

Further reading
 

Salticidae genera
Spiders of the Indian subcontinent